Hwang In-youp (born January 19, 1991) is a South Korean actor, model, and singer. He began his career in modeling industry before making his screen debut with a main role in the web series Why  (2018). He rose to international prominence through his breakthrough role in hit drama True Beauty (2020–21). He is also known for his role in the Netflix original series The Sound of Magic (2022) and his leading role in the television drama Why Her (2022).

Early life and education
Hwang In-youp was born in Uijeongbu, Gyeonggi-do in South Korea on January 19, 1991. He is the oldest son; his brother, who is three years younger, is a producer and singer-songwriter who goes by the name Inof. Hwang lived in Davao City, Philippines during his high school and college years, going by the English name Ryan Leon. He graduated from high school at the Philippine Nikkei Jin Kai International School, and later graduated with a Bachelor of Fine Arts degree in fashion design at the Philippine Women's College of Davao.

Career

2017–2019: Modelling and acting debut
Hwang entered the entertainment industry in 2017 as a runway model. Reports state that he was once under YG KPlus, a model management company owned by YG Entertainment.

In 2018, he made his acting debut in the Naver TV web series Why. He later signed a contract with the South Korean agency KeyEast, a subsidiary of SM Entertainment.

In 2019, he played Seo Kyo-won in the web series Freshman, and made his television debut with supporting role in the KBS2 historical television series The Tale of Nokdu.

2020–present: Rising popularity and international breakthrough
In 2020, Hwang gained recognition for his performance in the JTBC fantasy series 18 Again, a remake of the 2009 American film 17 Again. He played Goo Ja-sung, a school bully and the counterpart character of Stan, who was portrayed by Hunter Parrish in the original film.

Hwang rose to international prominence for his role in the smash hit 2020–21 tvN romantic-comedy series True Beauty, based on the on-going Webtoon of the same name. He portrayed Han Seo-jun, a secondary lead character. He contributed to the soundtrack of the series with the song "It Starts Today" (오늘부터 시작인걸).

Hwang also appeared in the independent short film Swimming Bird alongside Lee Ji-ah, which the film won at the 1st GwangMyeong Film Festival.

In 2021, Hwang was cast in fantasy musical series The Sound of Magic, which was released globally on Netflix in May 2022. He is also contributed to the soundtrack of the series with the song "I Mean It" (진지해 지금). On April 23, 2021, Keyeast announced that Hwang had signed a contract with Japan's agency Stream Media Corporation. Later, Hwang confirmed to star in the SBS mystery legal drama Why Her which  premiered in June 2022 marking his first lead role on a terrestrial TV station. On July 3, 2021, Hwang held his first global ontact fan meeting to communicate with his fans around the world titled "2021 HWANG IN YOUP Ontact Fan Meeting [Magazine H: Hi-High Vol.1]" via Olleh TV for local streaming and MyMusicTaste for the global audiences.

In 2022, Hwang's agency announced that he will be holding the 2022 "HWANG IN YOUP 1st Fan Meeting Tour" starting in South Korea. He held fan meetings in five countries, including Singapore, Indonesia, Philippines, and Thailand.

Personal life

Hwang had completed mandatory military service before auditioning for modelling career.

He has training in various martial arts such as Taekwondo (where he is a 3rd dan black belt), Hapkido and Kendo (or Kumdo as it is known in South Korea).

Discography

Singles

Filmography

Film

Television series

Web series

Web shows

Awards and nominations

Notes

References

External links
 
 

1991 births
Living people
People from Uijeongbu
21st-century South Korean male actors
South Korean hapkido practitioners
South Korean male models
South Korean male television actors
South Korean male actors
South Korean male film actors
South Korean male taekwondo practitioners